A 1876 marble sculpture of Edward Dickinson Baker by Horatio Stone is installed in the United States Capitol's Hall of Columns, in Washington, D.C.  Baker was the only U.S. senator ever to die in combat.

References

1876 sculptures
Marble sculptures in Washington, D.C.
Monuments and memorials in Washington, D.C.
Sculptures of men in Washington, D.C.
Statues in Washington, D.C.